Krasnyi Kut is a village in Kramatorsk Raion (district) in Donetsk Oblast of eastern Ukraine.

Demographics
Native language distribution as of the Ukrainian Census of 2001:
 Ukrainian: 77.46%
 Russian: 22.54%

References

Villages in Kramatorsk Raion